The 2009 Paris–Tours is the 103rd edition of this single day road bicycle racing event and is organized by the Amaury Sport Organisation (ASO), which also runs the Tour de France. The 230 km event took place on October 11, 2009 and was won by Philippe Gilbert, the Belgian rider for Silence–Lotto in 5 hours, 12 minutes, 23 seconds.  Gilbert, along with countryman Tom Boonen (Quick Step) and Slovenia's Borut Božič (Vacansoleil), escaped with 7 km to go at the base of the Côte de l'Epan behind an attack from Gilbert's teammate Greg Van Avermaet.

General standings

2009-10-11: Chartres–Tours, 230 km

References

Paris
Paris–Tours
Paris-Tours
Paris-Tours